Arthur L. Jarrett Jr. (July 20, 1907 – July 23, 1987) born to stage actor and playwright Arthur L. Jarrett Sr. (1884–1960). Art Jr. was an American singer, actor, and bandleader in the 1930s and 1940s.

Early career
Near the end of the 1920s into the 1930s, Jarrett was a member of the dance orchestras of Earl Burtnett, Ted Weems, Jimmie Noone, and Red Nichols, playing banjo, guitar, and trombone as well as singing. He recorded for Victor and Brunswick.  He also recorded a handful of vocals for Isham Jones in 1931. His high tenor voice made him popular in feature films and shorts. He had a record year in 1933, introducing such songs as "Everything I Have is Yours" from Dancing Lady, "Did You Ever See a Dream Walking?" from Sitting Pretty, and "Let's Fall in Love" from the movie of the same name.

Jarrett also performed in vaudeville.

Bandleader
In 1936, he left Ted Weems to lead his own orchestra. In 1941, he took on the leadership of Hal Kemp's orchestra following Kemp's death in an auto accident. He also appeared in the B western Trigger Pals and on Broadway in Three After Three. In 1932,

Later career
In the 1950s, Jarrett was a regular on a television musical show called Rhythm Rodeo, which aired on the DuMont Television Network. Eventually, he became a disc jockey and a salesman.

Personal life and death 
Jarrett was reportedly engaged to actress Gilda Gray but the marriage never took place. From 1933 to 1938, he was married to actress and swimmer Eleanor Holm. He died July 23, 1987, in Los Angeles, California, just three days after his 80th birthday.

Filmography

References

External links

Ted Weems and his Orchestra

1907 births
1987 deaths
Musicians from Brooklyn
20th-century American singers
Articles containing video clips
20th-century American male singers
Vaudeville performers
Victor Records artists